We Were That Song is the third major label studio album recorded by Canadian country music singer Brett Kissel. It was released December 8, 2017 through Warner Music Canada. We Were That Song entered the Canadian Albums Chart at number 29.

The album has produced four top-ten singles, including the Music Canada Gold-certified title track and "Anthem". It includes collaborations with Dave Mustaine of Megadeth and country music icon Charley Pride.

Critical reception
Anthony Easton of Exclaim! was highly critical of the album in terms of both production and lyrical content, describing it as "the worst country album of the year," and writing that "the stories [Kissel] tells are ones that we have heard before."

We Were That Song was given the Juno Award for Country Album of the Year in 2019. This marked Kissel's first win in the category, after being nominated with his previous two releases.

Track listing

Charts

Release history

References

2017 albums
Brett Kissel albums
Warner Music Group albums